Mö Mboj Maalik Mboj (var : Mö Mbody Maalik) was the last King of Waalo  prior to its fall to the French in 1855. The pre-colonial Kingdom of Waalo now lies within modern-day Senegal. The military conquest of Waalo in 1855 under Lingeer Ndate Yalla and her husband Tassé was one of many expeditions by the French colonialists in Senegambia but more so in Senegal. Moorish intervention in the political affairs of the Wolof Kingdom of Waalo propelled French military intervention, which led to the collapse of the royal dynasty and the disestablishment of the country.  The conquered Kingdom of Waalo was by 1855, under French rule. Mö Mboj Maalik Mboj succeeded to the throne as Brak (king of Waalo), ruling from 1840 to 1855. On his paternal line, he was a member of the reigning Mboj (var : Mbooj) paternal dynasty of Waalo. On his maternal line, he partains to the Loggar matriclan. The Loggars (of Moor/Maure origin) were one of the three reigning maternal dynasties of Waalo, the other two being Joos (of Serer origin via Lingeer Ndoye Demba, founded in the 14th century) and Tedyek (of Fula origin).

See also
Lingeer Fatim Beye
Lingeer Ndoye Demba
Joos Maternal Dynasty
Waalo
Maad a Sinig Kumba Ndoffene Famak Joof
Lat Dior
History of Senegal
History of the Gambia

References

Bibliography
Barry, Boubacar, "Le royaume du Waalo": le Sénégal avant la conquête, Karthala, 1985, pp 41, 265, 276,    (Retrieved : 8 July 2012)
Wade, Amadou, "Chronique du Walo Sénégalais (1186-1855)", B. Cissé trans., V. Monteil, editor, Bulletin de l'IFAN, série B, vol. 26, nos 3/4 (1941, 1964)
Ajayi, J. F. Ade, "Africa in the Nineteenth Century Until the 1880s", Volume 6, Editors : J. F. Ade Ajayi, Unesco. International Scientific Committee for the Drafting of a General History of Africa, University of California Press ( 1989), p 639, 

Year of birth missing
Year of death missing
19th-century monarchs in Africa
Senegalese royalty
Gambian royalty